Günəşli is a village and municipality in the Shabran Rayon of Azerbaijan. It has a population of 693.  The municipality consists of the villages of Günəşli and Daşlıyataq.

References

Populated places in Shabran District